Hop Church is a chapel of the Church of Norway in Gamvik Municipality in Troms og Finnmark county, Norway. It is located in the village of Skjånes. It is an annex chapel for the Gamvik parish which is part of the Hammerfest prosti (deanery) in the Diocese of Nord-Hålogaland. The white, wooden church was built in 1977 to serve the southern part of the municipality. The chapel is built on what is believed to be the site of a medieval church that was closed before the 1600s.

See also
List of churches in Nord-Hålogaland

References

Gamvik
Churches in Finnmark
Wooden churches in Norway
20th-century Church of Norway church buildings
Churches completed in 1977
1977 establishments in Norway